Pseudochironomini is a tribe of midges in the non-biting midge family (Chironomidae).

Genera & species
 Genus Pseudochironomus Malloch, 1915
P. anas Townes, 1945
P. articaudus Saether, 1977
P. badius Saether, 1977
P. chen Townes, 1945
P. crassus Townes, 1945
P. fulviventris (Johannsen, 1905)
P. julia (Curran, 1930)
P. netta Townes, 1945
C. prasinatus (Staeger, 1839) 
P. pseudoviridis (Malloch, 1915)
P. rex Hauber, 1947
P. richardsoni Malloch, 1915

References

Chironomidae
Nematocera tribes